Snow ("Сняг") is a Bulgarian film, a co-production with Ukraine, from 2015, directed by Ventsislav Vasilev.

The film premiere was at the XXXIII edition of the Golden Rose Film Festival in Varna on 9 October 2015. The film participated at the XXXI Warsaw International Film Festival, which took place in October 2015, and at the XXV festival for Eastern European cinema in Cottbus, Germany in November 2015. During the XIV festival for European cinema Cinedays in Skopje in 2015 it won the "Golden Sun" award for the best Balkan film. It participated at the XX Sofia International Film Fest in March 2016.

Actors 
 Plamen Velikov
 Ovanes Torosyan
 Krasimir Dokov
 Vladimir Yamnenko
 Ivana Papazova
 Bozhidar Popchev
 Biser Marinov
 Konstantin Asenov

References

External links 
 
 
 

2015 films
Ukrainian drama films
Bulgarian drama films